Ruy Barbosa, Bahia is a municipality in the state of Bahia in the North-East region of Brazil. Ruy Barbosa had a population of 30,857 as of 2020.

See also
List of municipalities in Bahia

References

Municipalities in Bahia